Niechorze Lighthouse (Polish: Latarnia morska Niechorze) is a lighthouse in Niechorze, on the Polish coast of the Baltic Sea, by a steep cliff. The lighthouse is located in Niechorze, West Pomeranian Voivodeship, in Poland.

The lighthouse is located in between the Kikut Lighthouse (about 30 km to the west), and the Kołobrzeg Lighthouse (34 km to the east).

History 
The lighthouse in Niechorze is located at the edge of a steep cliff, with a height of 20 metres. The lighthouse's base is a  square-shaped building, on both sides of the tower. The light glare from the lighthouse can be seen 36 km away due to the 1000w light bulb which is enhanced by 20 prismal crystals. The lighthouse in Niechorze was commissioned by the German Ministry of Shipping in 1863 and started operating on 1 December 1866. Although the lighthouse did not suffer any war damage in World War II, after the liberation of Poland – 8 mines left by the Germans were discovered, and safely removed without detonation. After the end of the Second World War there was a considerable delay restarting the lighthouse, it was not until 18 December 1948 when the lighthouse was finally operational – this was due to the erosion of the cliff which the lighthouse was located close to; the authorities secured the cliff by putting large boulders and rock armour (500 metres of heavy concrete) to secure the cliff and provide a stable ground for the lighthouse. Currently the lighthouse is open to tourists, with a viewpoint – nearby the lighthouse there is a miniature park of all Polish lighthouses, a popular attraction for families and enthusiasts.

Technical data 
 Light characteristic:
 Light: 0.45 s.
 Darkness: 9.55 s.
 Period: 10 s.
 Get this on a pdf

See also 

 List of lighthouses in Poland

References

External links 

  Niechorze Lighthouse - Latarnia morska (Niechorze) na portalu polska-org.pl  
 Urząd Morski w Słupsku  

Lighthouses completed in 1866
Resort architecture in Pomerania
Lighthouses in Poland
Tourist attractions in West Pomeranian Voivodeship
1866 establishments in Prussia